Blooming Glen is an unincorporated community in Hilltown Township in Bucks County, Pennsylvania, United States.

History
Blooming Glen was once known as "Perkasie" for a very short time. In the 1870s its name was Moyers Store, as that was the name of the post office, John S. Moyer was the postmaster. By the time Moyer died, the name was changed to Blooming Glen. William D. Bishop was appointed the next postmaster.

Geography
Blooming Glen is located at the intersection of Pennsylvania Route 113 and Blooming Glen Road.

References

Unincorporated communities in Bucks County, Pennsylvania
Unincorporated communities in Pennsylvania